Sorochinsky Urban Okrug is a municipal formation (an urban okrug) in Orenburg Oblast, Russia, one of the thirteen urban okrugs in the oblast. Its territory comprises the territories of two administrative divisions of Orenburg Oblast—Sorochinsky District and the Town of Sorochinsk.

It was established on June 1, 2015 by the Law #2824/781-V-OZ of Orenburg Oblast by merging the municipal formations of former Sorochinsky Municipal District and granting the resulting entity urban okrug status.

References

Notes

Sources

External links
Official website of Sorochinsky Urban Okrug 

Urban okrugs of Russia
States and territories established in 2015
2015 establishments in Russia
